Electrona subaspera, also known as the rough lanternfish, is a marine, mesopelagic fish. It occurs circumglobally between the subtropical convergence and the Antarctic polar front, in the southern Atlantic, Indian, and Pacific Oceans.

Size

References

Myctophidae
Fish of the Atlantic Ocean
Fish of the Indian Ocean
Fish of the Pacific Ocean
Taxa named by Albert Günther
Fish described in 1864